In geometry, the Newton–Gauss line (or Gauss–Newton line) is the line joining the midpoints of the three diagonals of a complete quadrilateral.

The midpoints of the two diagonals of a convex quadrilateral with at most two parallel sides are distinct and thus determine a line, the Newton line. If the sides of such a quadrilateral are extended to form a complete quadrangle, the diagonals of the quadrilateral remain diagonals of the complete quadrangle and the Newton line of the quadrilateral is the Newton–Gauss line of the complete quadrangle.

Complete quadrilaterals 

Any four lines in general position (no two lines are parallel, and no three are concurrent) form a complete quadrilateral. This configuration consists of a total of six points, the intersection points of the four lines, with three points on each line and precisely two lines through each point. These six points can be split into pairs so that the line segments determined by any pair do not intersect any of the given four lines except at the endpoints. These three line segments are called diagonals of the complete quadrilateral.

Existence of the Newton−Gauss line

It is a well-known theorem that the three midpoints of the diagonals of a complete quadrilateral are collinear.
There are several proofs of the result based on areas  or wedge products or, as the following proof, on Menelaus's theorem, due to Hillyer and published in 1920.

Let the complete quadrilateral  be labeled as in the diagram with diagonals  and their respective midpoints . Let the midpoints of  be  respectively. Again, similar triangles provide the following proportions,

However, the line  intersects the sides of triangle , so by Menelaus's theorem the product of the terms on the right hand sides is −1. Thus, the product of the terms on the left hand sides is also −1 and again by Menelaus's theorem, the points  are collinear on the sides of triangle .

Applications to cyclic quadrilaterals

The following are some results that use the Newton–Gauss line of complete quadrilaterals that are associated with cyclic quadrilaterals, based on the work of Barbu and Patrascu.

Equal angles 

Extend the diagonals  and  until they meet at the point of intersection, . Let the midpoint of the segment  be , and let the midpoint of the segment  be  (Figure 1).

Theorem 

Proof 
First show that the triangles  are similar.

Also, 

In the cyclic quadrilateral , these equalities hold:

Therefore, .

Let  be the radii of the circumcircles of  respectively. Apply the law of sines to the triangles, to obtain:

 

Remark 
If  is the midpoint of the line segment , it follows by the same reasoning that .

Isogonal lines

Theorem 
(Figure 2)

Proof 
Triangles   are similar by the above argument, so .

Therefore,

Two cyclic quadrilaterals sharing a Newton-Gauss line

Lemma 
Let  and  be the orthogonal projections of the point  on the lines  and  respectively.

Proof 
, as previously shown.

Therefore,

 

Therefore,  is a cyclic quadrilateral, and by the same reasoning,  also lies on a circle.

Theorem 
Extend the lines  to intersect  at  respectively (Figure 4).

The complete quadrilaterals  and  have the same Newton–Gauss line.

Proof 

If triangles  are congruent, and it will follow that  lies on the perpendicular bisector of the line .

To show that the triangles  are congruent, first observe that  is a parallelogram, since the points  are midpoints of  respectively.

Therefore,

Also note that

 

Hence,

 

Remark 
Due to  being congruent triangles, their circumcircles  are also congruent.

History 
The Newton–Gauss line proof was developed by the two mathematicians it is named after: Sir Isaac Newton and Carl Friedrich Gauss. The initial framework for this theorem is from the work of Newton, in his previous theorem on the Newton line, in which Newton showed that the center of a conic inscribed in a quadrilateral lies on the Newton–Gauss line.

The theorem of Gauss and Bodenmiller states that the three circles whose diameters are the diagonals of a complete quadrilateral are coaxal.

Notes

References

(available on-line as)

External links

Geometry
Quadrilaterals